In astronomy and planetary science, a magnetosphere is a region of space surrounding an astronomical object in which charged particles are affected by that object's magnetic field. It is created by a celestial body with an active interior dynamo. 

In the space environment close to a planetary body, the magnetic field resembles a magnetic dipole. Farther out, field lines can be significantly distorted by the flow of electrically conducting plasma, as emitted from the Sun (i.e., the solar wind) or a nearby star. Planets having active magnetospheres, like the Earth, are capable of mitigating or blocking the effects of solar radiation or cosmic radiation, that also protects all living organisms from potentially detrimental and dangerous consequences. This is studied under the specialized scientific subjects of plasma physics, space physics and aeronomy.

History

Study of Earth's magnetosphere began in 1600, when William Gilbert discovered that the magnetic field on the surface of Earth resembled that of a terrella, a small, magnetized sphere. In the 1940s, Walter M. Elsasser proposed the model of dynamo theory, which attributes Earth's magnetic field to the motion of Earth's iron outer core. Through the use of magnetometers, scientists were able to study the variations in Earth's magnetic field as functions of both time and latitude and longitude.

Beginning in the late 1940s, rockets were used to study cosmic rays. In 1958, Explorer 1, the first of the Explorer series of space missions, was launched to study the intensity of cosmic rays above the atmosphere and measure the fluctuations in this activity. This mission observed the existence of the Van Allen radiation belt (located in the inner region of Earth's magnetosphere), with the follow up Explorer 3 later that year definitively proving its existence. Also during 1958, Eugene Parker proposed the idea of the solar wind, with the term 'magnetosphere' being proposed by Thomas Gold in 1959 to explain how the solar wind interacted with the Earth's magnetic field. The later mission of Explorer 12 in 1961 led by the Cahill and Amazeen observation in 1963 of a sudden decrease in magnetic field strength near the noon-time meridian, later was named the magnetopause. By 1983, the International Cometary Explorer observed the magnetotail, or the distant magnetic field.

Structure and behavior
Magnetospheres are dependent on several variables: the type of astronomical object, the nature of sources of plasma and momentum, the period of the object's spin, the nature of the axis about which the object spins, the axis of the magnetic dipole, and the magnitude and direction of the flow of solar wind.

The planetary distance where the magnetosphere can withstand the solar wind pressure is called the Chapman–Ferraro distance. This is usefully modeled by the formula wherein  represents the radius of the planet,  represents the magnetic field on the surface of the planet at the equator, and  represents the velocity of the solar wind:

A magnetosphere is classified as "intrinsic" when , or when the primary opposition to the flow of solar wind is the magnetic field of the object. Mercury, Earth, Jupiter, Ganymede, Saturn, Uranus, and Neptune, for example, exhibit intrinsic magnetospheres. A magnetosphere is classified as "induced" when , or when the solar wind is not opposed by the object's magnetic field. In this case, the solar wind interacts with the atmosphere or ionosphere of the planet (or surface of the planet, if the planet has no atmosphere). Venus has an induced magnetic field, which means that because Venus appears to have no internal dynamo effect, the only magnetic field present is that formed by the solar wind's wrapping around the physical obstacle of Venus (see also Venus' induced magnetosphere). When , the planet itself and its magnetic field both contribute. It is possible that Mars is of this type.

Structure

Bow shock

The bow shock forms the outermost layer of the magnetosphere; the boundary between the magnetosphere and the ambient medium. For stars, this is usually the boundary between the stellar wind and interstellar medium; for planets, the speed of the solar wind there decreases as it approaches the magnetopause.

Magnetosheath

The magnetosheath is the region of the magnetosphere between the bow shock and the magnetopause. It is formed mainly from shocked solar wind, though it contains a small amount of plasma from the magnetosphere. It is an area exhibiting high particle energy flux, where the direction and magnitude of the magnetic field varies erratically. This is caused by the collection of solar wind gas that has effectively undergone thermalization. It acts as a cushion that transmits the pressure from the flow of the solar wind and the barrier of the magnetic field from the object.

Magnetopause

The magnetopause is the area of the magnetosphere wherein the pressure from the planetary magnetic field is balanced with the pressure from the solar wind. It is the convergence of the shocked solar wind from the magnetosheath with the magnetic field of the object and plasma from the magnetosphere. Because both sides of this convergence contain magnetized plasma, the interactions between them are complex. The structure of the magnetopause depends upon the Mach number and beta of the plasma, as well as the magnetic field. The magnetopause changes size and shape as the pressure from the solar wind fluctuates.

Magnetotail
Opposite the compressed magnetic field is the magnetotail, where the magnetosphere extends far beyond the astronomical object. It contains two lobes, referred to as the northern and southern tail lobes. Magnetic field lines in the northern tail lobe point towards the object while those in the southern tail lobe point away. The tail lobes are almost empty, with few charged particles opposing the flow of the solar wind. The two lobes are separated by a plasma sheet, an area where the magnetic field is weaker, and the density of charged particles is higher.

Earth's magnetosphere

Over Earth's equator, the magnetic field lines become almost horizontal, then return to reconnect at high latitudes. However, at high altitudes, the magnetic field is significantly distorted by the solar wind and its solar magnetic field. The magnetopause exists at a distance of several hundred kilometers above Earth's surface. Earth's magnetopause has been compared to a sieve because it allows solar wind particles to enter. Kelvin–Helmholtz instabilities occur when large swirls of plasma travel along the edge of the magnetosphere at a different velocity from the magnetosphere, causing the plasma to slip past. This results in magnetic reconnection, and as the magnetic field lines break and reconnect, solar wind particles are able to enter the magnetosphere. On Earth's nightside, the magnetic field extends in the magnetotail, which lengthwise exceeds . Earth's magnetotail is the primary source of the polar aurora. Also, NASA scientists have suggested that Earth's magnetotail might cause "dust storms" on the Moon by creating a potential difference between the day side and the night side.

Other objects
Many astronomical objects generate and maintain magnetospheres. In the Solar System this includes the Sun, Mercury, Jupiter, Saturn, Uranus, Neptune, and Ganymede. Jupiter's magnetosphere is stronger than Earth's by an order of magnitude, and its magnetic moment is approximately 18,000 times larger.
Venus, Mars, and Pluto, on the other hand, have no magnetic field. This may have had significant effects on their geological history. It is theorized that Venus and Mars may have lost their primordial water to photodissociation and the solar wind. A strong magnetosphere greatly slows this process. The magnetosphere of an exoplanet was detected in 2021.

See also
Geospace
Plasma (physics)

References

Geomagnetism
Ionosphere
Planetary science
Space plasmas
Concepts in astronomy
Articles containing video clips